The Gyeongwon Line was a railway line of the Chosen Government Railway in central Korea. It was the first east-west trunk line to be opened, connecting the capital Gyeongseong to the important east coast port of Wonsan. Following the partition of Korea, the line was divided between North and South Korea.

History
One of the earliest construction plans of the Railway Bureau of the Government General of Korea was for an east−west trunk line to connect Gyeongseong to the important port of Wonsan. The first section of this planned line was the  segment from Yongsan to Uijeongbu, which was opened by the Chosen Government Railway (Sentetsu) on 15 October 1911. Construction westbound from Wonsan began in 1912, and segments of the line were opened at various stages over the subsequent five years, until the final section,  from Sepo to Gosan, was opened on 16 August 1914, completing the line from Gyeongseong to Wonsan.

The line was built in the following segments:

The first railway electrification projects to be undertaken in Korea were implemented along the Gyeongwon Line. The first of these was the privately owned Geumgangsan Electric Railway, which was first opened in 1924 from Cheorwon to Gimhwa, and by 1931 had been extended all the way to Naegeumgang.

Also in the 1930s, Sentetsu, together with the South Manchuria Railway, was developing plans to create an electrified railway all the way from Busan to Xinjing, capital of Manchukuo. The first stage of this plan was the electrification of the Gyeongwon, Gyeonggyeong and Gyeongin lines, and in March 1940, the Imperial Diet budgeted 3.6 million Yen for electrification equipment for this plan. Electrification of the Pokkye−Gosan section of the Gyeongwon Line began in December 1940; it was completed and commissioned on 27 March 1944, and commercial electric operations commenced on 1 April 1944.

After the partition of Korea following the end of the Pacific War in 1945, the Gyeongwon Line was split along the 38th parallel between the stations of Hantangang and Choseongni. The railways in both South and North were nationalised, and the newly established Korean National Railroad took over operation of the truncated Gyeongwon Line, from Seoul to Choseongni; in the North, the Korean State Railway merged its section of the Gyeongwon Line, Choseongni−Wonsan, with the Wonsan−Gowon section of the former Hamgyeong Line to create the Gangwon Line.

The line was severely damaged during the Korean War. After the ceasefire and the subsequent establishment of the Military Demarcation Line, the division of the line changed, with the South gaining control of the line further northwards as far as Woljeongni.

For the post-war histories of the Northern and Southern sections of the line, see Kangwon Line for the Northern section, and Gyeongwon Line for the Southern section.

Route

References

 Japanese Government Railways (1937), 鉄道停車場一覧. 昭和12年10月1日現在(The List of the Stations as of 1 October 1937), Kawaguchi Printing Company, Tokyo, pp 495–496

 
Railway lines in Korea
Sentetsu railway lines
Railway lines opened in 1911